The Pinto Bandit is a 1944 American Western film written and directed by Elmer Clifton. The film stars Dave O'Brien, James Newill, Guy Wilkerson, Mady Lawrence, James Martin and Jack Ingram. The film was released on April 27, 1944, by Producers Releasing Corporation.

Plot

Cast          
Dave O'Brien as Tex Wyatt 
James Newill as Jim Steele 
Guy Wilkerson as Panhandle Perkins
Mady Lawrence as Kitty Collins
James Martin as Walter Collins
Jack Ingram as Tom Torrant
Ed Cassidy as Doc Garson 
Budd Buster as P.T. Heneberry
Karl Hackett as Sheriff Bisbee
Bob Kortman as Draw Dudley 
Charles King as Spur Sneely

See also
The Texas Rangers series:
 The Rangers Take Over (1942)
 Bad Men of Thunder Gap (1943)
 West of Texas (1943)
 Border Buckaroos (1943)
 Fighting Valley (1943)
 Trail of Terror (1943)
 The Return of the Rangers (1943)
 Boss of Rawhide (1943)
 Outlaw Roundup (1944)
 Guns of the Law (1944)
 The Pinto Bandit (1944)
 Spook Town (1944)
 Brand of the Devil (1944)
 Gunsmoke Mesa (1944)
 Gangsters of the Frontier (1944)
 Dead or Alive (1944)
 The Whispering Skull (1944)
 Marked for Murder (1945)
 Enemy of the Law (1945)
 Three in the Saddle (1945)
 Frontier Fugitives (1945)
 Flaming Bullets (1945)

References

External links
 

1944 films
1940s English-language films
American Western (genre) films
1944 Western (genre) films
Producers Releasing Corporation films
Films directed by Elmer Clifton
American black-and-white films
1940s American films